5-4 (pronounced "five to four") is a podcast that covers the U.S. Supreme Court from a critical, progressive perspective. The podcast's tagline describes it as being "about how much the Supreme Court sucks", and providing an "irreverent tour of all the ways in which the law is shaped by politics." It was launched by Leon Neyfakh's Prologue Projects in partnership with the Westwood One Podcast Network.

Premise

The hosts are self-described advocates for legal realism.

The first episode of the podcast was about Bush v. Gore.

History

5-4 was launched in February 2020 by Leon Neyfakh's Prologue Projects in partnership with Westwood One Podcast Network (which has since been renamed Cumulus Podcast Network). Its hosts, Rhiannon, Peter, and Michael, maintain a semi-anonymous profiles as podcast hosts, disclosing only their first names and a "handful of biographical details" in any given episode. Rihannon worked as a public defender in Austin, Texas; Peter previously served as in-house counsel for MetLife and was fired upon his employers finding out about his role on the podcast; Michael was a former associate at Sullivan & Cromwell, and self-described “reformed corporate lawyer.”

Neyfakh's original advertising partnership with Westwood One failed to generate significant revenue for the podcast, so the decision was made to instead fund its production through Patreon. The following month, Nicholas Quah wrote in Vulture: "After its pivot to Patreon, 5-4 is now significantly better positioned for the next stage of its life, and its experience stands as a good example of the fact that a race for scale isn't the only way to run a shop in this business."

Notable guests

Elected American politicians have been guests on the show. Sheldon Whitehouse, Senator of Rhode Island, appeared on the podcast in 2021. Senator Elizabeth Warren, a "fan", was a guest in July 2022. Representatives Ro Khanna and Mondaire Jones appeared in separate episodes, discussing court reform.

Jamelle Bouie discussed the Democratic political strategy in July 2022.

Alec Karakatsanis appeared, criticizing the U.S. legal system.

Reception

Within a week of its launch in February 2021, the 5-4 Patreon had accumulated almost 3,000 paid subscribers, enough to generate roughly $200,000 in revenue each year. As of July 2022, it earns $35,000 per month. It is the 39th most popular podcast tracked by Graphtreon, and the 101st most popular Patreon project overall. The podcast has typically been well-received, with the hosts' "funny, forceful" argumentation" and "enthusiastically acidic takes on the once-widely revered American legal institution" praised for making the law more accessible to its listeners and everyday people. It particularly gained popularity in the summer of 2022, after the overturning of Roe v. Wade under Dobbs v. Jackson Women's Health Organization; the month of the Dobbs decision, the number of episode downloads increased 90% from the last year.

Episodes
, 5–4 has had the following episodes:

2020

2021

2022

References

External links

Political podcasts
2020 podcast debuts
Liberal podcasts